Sheela Kaur is a former Indian actress who has starred in several Telugu and Tamil films along with a few Malayalam and Kannada films. She is known for her performances in Nandha, Adhurs, Parugu and Veerasamy. She has appeared in nearly 20 films as a child actor.

Personal life
On 12 March 2020, Kaur married businessmen Santhosh Reddy in Chennai.

Filmography

References

External links 

 

Indian film actresses
Actresses in Tamil cinema
Indian child actresses
Actresses in Telugu cinema
Actresses in Kannada cinema
Living people
Actresses in Malayalam cinema
Actresses from Chennai
Child actresses in Tamil cinema
20th-century Indian actresses
21st-century Indian child actresses
Year of birth missing (living people)